Cristoval is a Portuguese parish, located in the municipality of Melgaço. The population in 2011 was 528, in an area of 5.56 km2.

In this parish lies the small village of Cevide, the northernmost place in Portugal.

References

Freguesias of Melgaço, Portugal
Extreme points of Portugal